Joseph Gurney Barclay may refer to:
 Joseph Gurney Barclay (missionary)
 Joseph Gurney Barclay (astronomer)